Alasdair Kent is a British-Australian operatic tenor, principally known for his interpretations of the Italian bel canto of Rossini and Bellini, and Mozart. In 2016, Richard Bonynge presented him with the Joan Sutherland & Richard Bonynge Foundation Bel Canto Award. After his European debut with the Rossini Opera Festival in 2017, his international career has seen debut performances around Europe and the United States, usually in the roles of Rossini.

Early life and education
Alasdair Kent was born in Perth, Western Australia. He studied music and performance at the Western Australian Academy of Performing Arts and the University of Western Australia with mezzo-soprano Megan Sutton, as well as English literature, and Italian, French and German languages. He sang with the West Australian Opera Chorus for several seasons in various repertoire, and also took part in the Lisa Gasteen National Opera Program. In 2017, he received an Artist Diploma from the Academy of Vocal Arts in Philadelphia, where he studied with Bill Schuman and sang performances of Lindoro (L'italiana in Algeri), Ferrando (Così fan tutte), Don Ottavio (Don Giovanni) and Rinuccio (Gianni Schicchi). He was an Emerging Artist with Opera Philadelphia, and a Filene Young Artist with Wolf Trap Opera, where he performed as Ritornello in Florian Leopold Gassmann's L'opera seria, and Giocondo in Rossini's La pietra del paragone. He also took part in the Martina Arroyo Foundation's Prelude to Performance and the Merola Opera Program.

Career
Kent made his professional debut in Australia at the age of 25, as Don Ramiro in La Cenerentola with Opera Queensland in 2013. While at AVA, he made his US concert debut with The Dallas Opera in 2015, and his US operatic debut in 2016 with Opera Philadelphia in Cold Mountain, an operatic adaptation of Charles Frazier's novel composed by Grammy Award and Pulitzer Prize winner Jennifer Higdon. His European debut followed in 2017, as Cavaliere Belfiore in Il viaggio a Reims for the Rossini Opera Festival in Pesaro, marking the beginning of his international career. He has since been engaged at many of the most important international theatres and concert venues, including the Bayerische Staatsoper, the Vienna State Opera, Opernhaus Zürich, the Teatro di San Carlo, the Royal Concertgebouw, Konzerthaus Berlin, the Elbphilharmonie and the Théâtre des Champs-Élysées.

A tenore di grazia frequently associated with bel canto, his principal repertoire includes roles of Rossini, Mozart, Donizetti, Bellini, Bizet, and Verdi, though he has also performed works by composers as diverse as Tchaikovsky and Stravinsky. Of these composers, he has sung most frequently:

The Barber of Seville, debuted with the Martina Arroyo Foundation’s Prelude to Performance, further performances with Opernhaus Zürich, Bavarian State Opera, The Dallas Opera, the Norwegian National Opera and Ballet, Oper Köln, Theater Basel the Orchestra Sinfonica G. Rossini.
L'italiana in Algeri, debuted with the Academy of Vocal Arts, further performances with the Hungarian State Opera in Budapest, Opéra de Toulon, Opéra national de Montpellier, The Israeli Opera, and the Royal Concertgebouw.
Così fan tutte, debuted with the Academy of Vocal Arts, further performances with Opera Australia on tour to the Royal Opera House Muscat, the Lyric Opera of Kansas City, The Israeli Opera, the Rete Lirica delle Marche, and performances with the Opéra national de Bordeaux that were ultimately cancelled due to the COVID-19 pandemic.

Other notable operatic performances include Paolino in Cimarosa's Il matrimonio segreto, in Pier Luigi Pizzi's new production with the Festival della Valle d'Itria and the Teatro Regio di Torino, Tamino in Die Zauberflöte for the Royal Opera House Muscat, Argirio in Rossini's Tancredi with the Teatro Petruzzelli, and his debut as Arturo in I puritani with Ópera de Oviedo in 2020. In concert and recital, the tenor's performances include various repertoire, ranging from Rossini's virtuoso Messa di Gloria to Lili Boulanger's song cycle Clairières dans le ciel.

Repertoire

Bellini: I puritani – Lord Arturo Talbot
Bizet: Don Procopio – Don Odoardo
Cimarosa: Il matrimonio segreto – Paolino
Donizetti
 Deux hommes et une femme – Pepé
 Don Pasquale – Ernesto
Gassmann: L'opera seria – Ritornello
Mozart
 Die Zauberflöte – Tamino
 Così fan tutte – Ferrando
 Die Entführung aus dem Serail – Belmonte
 Don Giovanni – Don Ottavio
Puccini: Gianni Schicchi – Rinuccio
Rossini
 Il barbiere di Siviglia – Il Conte di Almaviva
 La Cenerentola – Don Ramiro
 L'italiana in Algeri – Lindoro
 Il viaggio a Reims  – Il Cavaliere Belfiore
 La pietra del paragone – Il Cavaliere Giocondo
 Tancredi – Argirio
Verdi: Falstaff – Fenton

Awards

2017 Gerda Lissner Foundation International Vocal Competition First Prize
2017 Loren L. Zachary Society National Vocal Competition First Prize
2017 The Marten Bequest, prize for Singing
2017 Metropolitan Opera National Council Auditions National Semifinalist
2016 Joan Sutherland & Richard Bonynge Foundation Bel Canto Award, Georg Solti Accademia Prize
2016 Licia Albanese-Puccini Foundation International Vocal Competition Second Prize
2016 Academy of Vocal Arts Giargiari Bel Canto Competition First Prize & Audience Prize
2016 Mildred Miller International Voice Competition First Prize
2015 Violetta DuPont Vocal Competition First Prize

Discography
 Poul Ruders' The Thirteenth Child—Sarah Shafer (Princess Lyra), Tamara Mumford (Queen Gertrude), Ashraf Sewailam (Drokan), Matt Boehler (King Hjarne), Alasdair Kent (Prince Frederic), David Portillo (Benjamin), Alex Rosen (Corbin), Bridge Academy Singers & Odense Symfoniorkester, Benjamin Shwartz & David Starobin (conductors), Bridge Records, 2019.
 The Exquisite Hour—Alasdair Kent (tenor), David Wickham (pianist), 2021.

References

External links

 Management: AART Music
 Alasdair Kent Operabase
, from L'italiana in Algeri (2018)

Year of birth missing (living people)
20th-century births
Living people
Musicians from Perth, Western Australia
Australian operatic tenors
Western Australian Academy of Performing Arts alumni
Academy of Vocal Arts alumni